Pumawasi (Quechua puma cougar, puma, wasi house, "puma house",  Hispanicized spelling Pumahuasi) is a mountain in the Cusco Region in Peru, about  high. It is situated in the Paruro Province, Colcha District.

References 

Mountains of Peru
Mountains of Cusco Region